Bouazizi is an Arabic surname. Notable people with the surname include:

 Mohamed Bouazizi (1984–2011), Tunisian activist
 Mohamed-Bouazizi Square
 Riadh Bouazizi (born 1973), Tunisian footballer

Arabic-language surnames